David Roberto Bárcena Ríos (26 December 1941 – 22 February 2017) was a Mexican equestrian who competed at five Olympic Games. He competed in the Modern Pentathlon at the 1964 and 1968 Olympics and in Eventing at the 1972, 1976 and 1980 Olympics. At his fifth Olympics, he won bronze in the Team Event.

References

1941 births
2017 deaths
Mexican male equestrians
Olympic equestrians of Mexico
Mexican male modern pentathletes
Olympic modern pentathletes of Mexico
Olympic bronze medalists for Mexico
Modern pentathletes at the 1964 Summer Olympics
Modern pentathletes at the 1968 Summer Olympics
Equestrians at the 1972 Summer Olympics
Equestrians at the 1976 Summer Olympics
Equestrians at the 1980 Summer Olympics
Medalists at the 1980 Summer Olympics
Equestrians at the 1975 Pan American Games
Pan American Games bronze medalists for Mexico
Pan American Games medalists in equestrian
Medalists at the 1975 Pan American Games
20th-century Mexican people